The 1988 West Virginia Mountaineers football team represented West Virginia University in the 1988 NCAA Division I-A football season. It was the Mountaineers' 96th overall season and they competed as a Division I-A Independent. The team was led by head coach Don Nehlen, in his ninth year, and played their home games at Mountaineer Field in Morgantown, West Virginia. They finished the season with a record of eleven wins and one loss (11–1 overall), and a loss against No. 1 Notre Dame in the 1989 Fiesta Bowl for the national championship.

Schedule

Rankings

1988 season

The 1987 season was the beginning of Major Harris as the starting quarterback for West Virginia. Only a redshirt-freshman, Harris led the Mountaineers to a Sun Bowl berth, after a 1–3 start.

The '88 season opened with coach Don Nehlen's alma mater, Bowling Green. The win marked the beginning of the run, winning 62–14. West Virginia beat their next opponent, Cal-Fullerton, 45–10. West Virginia's first challenge was against the Maryland Terrapins. West Virginia got behind the Terps 14–0, but pulled away at halftime, winning 55–24.

West Virginia's next game was at the Pittsburgh Panthers. The game was a defensive struggle, until running back A.B. Brown, a Pitt transfer, ran a draw for 64-yards and the score. Scoring 14-points in the fourth quarter, the Mountaineers broke away. In the 1988 Backyard Brawl, West Virginia was installed as a one-point underdog by the odds makers. The Mountaineers rolled to a 31–10 victory over Pitt on the way to their first undefeated, untied regular season in school history. West Virginia then traveled to rival Virginia Tech, and won 22–10, even though they produced four fumbles in the game. The next two games, a win at East Carolina, and a 59-point win at Boston College, gave West Virginia a 7–0 record.

Next, the late October matchup vs Penn State at Mountaineer Field is widely regarded as one of the greatest games in Mountaineer football history. Before a nationwide CBS audience, the Mountaineers were up 34–8 before the half. On a draw play, runningback Undra Johnson ran 55 yards for the touchdown to end the half. The game also included a touchdown run by Major Harris, which is remembered in West Virginia lore as "The Run".

The next game was at the Cincinnati Bearcats, where the Mountaineers started slow in the first half. Receiver Reggie Rembert scored three times, and the Mountaineers won by scoring 24 points in the third quarter. The Mountaineers traveled to Giants Stadium to play Rutgers, who had beat Penn St., Boston College, and Michigan State. The Mountaineers played poor, but came out with the win.

The final regular season game of the season was at home, against the Syracuse Orangemen. The Orangemen were 8–2, while the Mountaineers were 10–0. The highlight of the game was a 49-yard interception by Willie Edwards that was taken for a touchdown. The Mountaineers won 31–9, and took a famous lap around the stadium to entertain the 65,000 fans in Morgantown.

National championship
West Virginia traveled to the Fiesta Bowl to play the only other undefeated team in the NCAA, the Notre Dame Fighting Irish. Free-safety Darrell Whitmore was out for the Mountaineers, but Nehlen moved star Bo Orlando from strong safety to free to fill the hole. Nehlen recalled the move as "our first mistake...". "Another mistake I made is that I let the media overrun us."

West Virginia's offense was doomed from the third play of the game. Major Harris separated his shoulder on the third play when he was slammed to the ground by Irish Linebacker Michael Stonebreaker.  He couldn't throw well for the rest of the game. The WVU coaches also abandoned their plans to run a lot of option football out of fear of further injuring Harris.  Linemen John Stroia and Bob Kovach were injured for the Mountaineers in that game as well. NG Jim Gray would also suffer an early injury in the game. Notre Dame completely dominated the game.  West Virginia only made one serious threat.  Willie Edwards (Now coaching at Morgantown High School * class of 1984) picked off a Tony Rice pass in the 3rd quarter.  ND led by 13 points at the time.  A Harris incompletion and two ND sacks took WVU out of field goal range, and the threat was over.  ND opened up a 21-point lead before a late WVU touchdown made the score respectable.  WVU lost 34–21, it was their first loss of the season for the national championship.

Roster

West Virginia's '88 team was highlighted with an explosive offense, led by Major Harris. Harris, only a sophomore, threw an exceptional deep ball in addition to his remarkable scrambling ability. Running backs A.B. Brown, Undra Johnson, Eugene Napoleon, and Craig Taylor at fullback highlighted the run game. The runners were led by Rick Phillips and Brian Smider on the offensive line, along with Stroia and Kovach, while Kevin Koken led the line at center. Early in the season, Keith Winn was moved from receiver to tight end, providing help to the run game, but was more famous as a deep-pass threat. The receivers catching the balls from Harris were led by Reggie Rembert, who was accompanied by Calvin Phillips and Grantis Bell.

Coach Don Nehlen credited West Virginia's '88 team's defense as being the main factor to their success. The linebacking core included Renaldo Turnbull, Chris Haering, Steve Grant, Dale Jackson, Theron Ellis, and Robert Pickett. Mike Fox and Chris Parker headed the defensive line, along with Chris Haering. The secondary was one of the best in West Virginia history, led by Bo Orlando and Darrell Whitmore. Orlando had a good pro career with the Houston Oilers and Pittsburgh Steelers, while Darrell went pro in baseball. Willie Edwards played corner along with Alvoid Mays, who went pro as well, and Lawrence Drumgoole and David Lockwood played solid backup corner.

Don Nehlen was the head coach while being assisted by assistant head coach, wide receivers coach, and recruiting coordinator Doc Holliday.

Game summaries

vs. Bowling Green

Statistics

vs. Cal State Fullerton

Statistics

vs. Maryland

Statistics

at Pittsburgh

Statistics

at Virginia Tech

Statistics

at East Carolina

Statistics

vs. Boston College

Statistics

vs. Penn State

Statistics

at Cincinnati

Statistics

at Rutgers

Statistics

vs. Syracuse

Statistics

vs. Notre Dame (Sunkist Fiesta Bowl)

Statistics

Honors

References

West Virginia
West Virginia Mountaineers football seasons
Lambert-Meadowlands Trophy seasons
West Virginia Mountaineers football